Saphenista rosariana is a species of moth of the family Tortricidae. It is found on Cuba.

The wingspan is about 7.5 mm. The ground colour of the forewings is cream with pale brownish-cream suffusions and browner dots. The markings are pale brownish cream with a slight olive hue. The hindwings are pale brownish cream.

Etymology
The species name refers to Sierra del Rosario, the type locality.

References

Moths described in 2007
Saphenista
Endemic fauna of Cuba